The  is a Japanese Shinkansen high-speed railway network. It is an extension of the San'yō Shinkansen from Honshu connecting the city of Fukuoka (Hakata Station) in the north of Japan's Kyushu Island to the city of Kagoshima (Kagoshima-Chuo Station) in the south. The line runs parallel to the existing Kagoshima Main Line and is operated by Kyushu Railway Company (JR Kyushu).

The southernmost  section of the track was constructed first, opening on 13 March 2004. The dual-track offered a significant improvement in transit time over the equivalent single-track section of the Kagoshima Main Line, despite the need for passengers to change to a Relay Tsubame narrow gauge train at Shin-Yatsushiro, and the remainder of the journey to Hakata Station. The northernmost  section opened on 12 March 2011, enabling through-services to Shin-Osaka (and with an interchange, to Tokyo). However, opening ceremonies were cancelled due to the 2011 Tōhoku earthquake and tsunami,

A cross-platform interchange to a relay service called 'Relay Kamome' at Takeo-Onsen station offers a connection to Hakata.

Kagoshima Route
Construction of the  began in 1991, and the first segment between Kagoshima and Shin-Yatsushiro opened on 13 March 2004. This initial section cut travel times between the two cities from 2 hours and 10 minutes to 35 minutes and reduced the time between Hakata and Kagoshima from 4 hours to 2 hours. When the entire line was completed, the travel time from Hakata to Kagoshima was further reduced to about an hour and 20 minutes. Like all Shinkansen lines, the Kyushu Shinkansen is standard gauge.

The line's Sakura and Mizuho services often operate through to Shin-Ōsaka Station via the San'yō Shinkansen. All-stop trains are named Tsubame ("Swallow"), the name of the former Hakata-Kagoshima limited express service, and are solely truncated to the Kyushu Shinkansen.

In September 2011, six months after the line's completion, JR Kyushu reported a year-over-year increase in ridership of 64% to the southern part of Kyushu (between Kumamoto and Kagoshima), easily surpassing the 40% increase projected by the company. By the first anniversary, ridership had increased, mainly from tourists from Kansai and Chugoku. In northern Kyushu, where there is fierce competition with conventional JR rapid service, the private Nishi-Nippon Railroad, and expressway buses, Shinkansen ridership increased by only 38% (compared to the now-discontinued conventional express Relay Tsubame), falling short of estimates.

Nishi Kyushu (Nagasaki) Route

Other planned routes
According to the Shinkansen Basic Plan laid out in 1973, two other routes would accompany the Kagoshima and West Kyushu (Nagasaki) routes: the East Kyushu Shinkansen, from Hakata to Kagoshima-Chūō via Ōita and Miyazaki, paralleling the Nippō Main Line; and the Trans-Kyushu Shinkansen, linking  and Ōita, and connecting with the also-planned Shikoku Shinkansen to Matsuyama, Takamatsu and Osaka. These plans have been shelved indefinitely and are unlikely to be reconsidered until the Shinkansen lines that are already under construction are completed.

Station list

 Tsubame trains stop at all stations. For Mizuho and Sakura, all trains stop at stations marked "●", while some trains stop at those marked "▲". All trains stop at Hakata, Kumamoto and Kagoshima-Chūō.

Legend:

Services

Kagoshima route
The trains were developed by Hitachi, and based on the 700 series trains already in service on the Tokaido/Sanyo Shinkansen line.

8-car N700-7000 and N700-8000 series trains are used on through-running services between Shin-Osaka and Kagoshima-Chūō. The first set (S1) was delivered to Hakata Depot in October 2008.

Three services operate on the line, in order of speed: Mizuho, Sakura, and Tsubame. The Mizuho makes two return trips between Shin-Osaka and Kagoshima-Chūō during the morning hours, and two return trips during the evening, with an end-to-end journey time of 3 hours 45 minutes. Sakura services run once per hour throughout the day between Shin-Osaka and Kagoshima-Chūō making additional stops, with an end-to-end travel time of 4 hours 10 minutes. There are also one to two Sakura services every hour between Hakata and either Kumamoto or Kagoshima-Chūō. Tsubame trains operate the all-stations shuttle service between Hakata and Kumamoto once to twice per hour, with some services operating to/from Kagoshima-Chūō. Mizuho trains can not be used by foreign passengers traveling with a Japan Rail Pass.

Nishi Kyushu route

Services are operated by 6-car N700S series trains with a service type named Kamome.

Incidents

2016 Kumamoto earthquakes

On the evening of 14 April 2016, the entire length of the Kagoshima Route was shut down after the first of two powerful earthquakes struck Kumamoto prefecture. There was extensive damage along the route, including cracks in elevated support structures at 25 locations and collapsed sound insulation walls in nearly 80 locations.

An 800 series train was  derailed near Kumamoto Station after the first tremor, while the train was deadheading.  On 18 April, JR Kyushu began attempts to return the derailed train to the tracks.

On 27 April 2016, the line reopened with reduced speed and service frequency.

2021 Attempted arson 
On the morning of 8 November 2021, a 69-year old man from Fukuoka attempted to set a Sakura Shinkansen service on fire. The train, Sakura #401, was travelling between Kumamoto and Shin-Yatsuhiro stations at the time of the attempted arson. No casualties were reported. According to the perpetrator, the motive of the incident was to replicate the October 2021 Tokyo attack.

References

External links

  

High-speed railway lines in Japan
Lines of Kyushu Railway Company
Railway lines opened in 2004
Standard gauge railways in Japan
2004 establishments in Japan